Daphne Veras Jordan (born November 28, 1959) is an American politician and attorney who served as a member of the New York State Senate, representing the 43rd district from 2019 to 2022. The district includes northern portions of the Hudson Valley as well as the eastern portions of the Capital Region. Jordan is a Republican. Prior to her Senate tenure, Jordan served as a member of the town board in Halfmoon, New York.

Early life and education 

Daphne Jordan was born in Philadelphia, Pennsylvania, but spent most of her formative years growing up in Shavertown in Northeastern Pennsylvania.

Of Greek descent, Jordan's paternal family comes from Mytilene and Evia, while her maternal family comes from Skoura and Kastania. Her father, Democritos Demitri Venizelos Veras, was the godson of 20th century Greek prime minister Sofoklis Venizelos.

Senator Jordan attended Wyoming Seminary College Prep in Kingston, Pennsylvania, graduating Cum Laude.

Jordan earned a Bachelor of Arts degree in Government and English from Lehigh University, graduating Cum Laude with Government Department Honors, Sigma Tau Delta National English Honorary Society, Alpha Gamma Delta Award for Scholarship and Activities and is an All-Time Letter Winner Division 1 Lacrosse. Jordan also was a football and basketball cheerleader for four years and played as a violinist in orchestra and ensembles.

Senator Jordan earned a Juris Doctor from Penn State Dickinson Law.

Career 

Jordan was the owner and founder of DAPHNE’S, in Exton, Pennsylvania & Wilmington, Delaware, from October 1985 to August 1995. As the owner and founder, Jordan directed and coordinated total operation of two upscale retail stores and catalog specializing in monogrammed gifts and detailed corporate gifts, employing, and supervising 14 personnel. In 1995, Jordan successfully sold her business.

Jordan also was the self-employed founder of PSYCHOLOGICAL BILLING SERVICES, a small business located in Halfmoon, NY, from September 1999 to June 2014. As the business founder, Jordan recovered outstanding and disputed insurance claims for mental health providers. Upon recovery of claims, Jordan also set up and provided all insurance billing for the provider, and successfully recovering over $600,000 in claims in 2013, which was the final year of operation for the business.
		
Jordan served on the Halfmoon Planning Board from 2002 to 2005, and later served on the Halfmoon Zoning Board of Appeals from 2006 to 2014. In 2014, Jordan was elected to the Halfmoon Town Board. She was reelected in 2015.

Senator Jordan volunteered her time and talents serving as a Trustee, Member of the Executive Committee, and Treasurer for the Clifton Park-Halfmoon Public Library, successfully managing a $3 million operating budget and $15 million construction budget for the new library that was completed on time and on budget. Also, she developed the first template for the library’s five-year budget plan and served as liaison to facilitate and procure a $408,000 grant for a Green and LEED Certified Library. Senator Jordan currently serves as a Director of the Clifton Park-Halfmoon Library Foundation.

Jordan worked as the Legislative Director and Senate Local Government Committee Director for her predecessor, Senator Kathy Marchione.

New York Senate 

In 2018, Republican Senator Kathy Marchione announced that she would not seek reelection in Senate District 43 that fall. The announcement immediately put the seat into play as a competitive district. Following Marchione's retirement, Jordan announced that she would seek to succeed her.

Jordan described herself as pro-life and pro-Second Amendment. Jordan netted many endorsements running on a platform that she said would serve as a check and balance to Governor Andrew Cuomo and the powerful New York City Democrats. Jordan opposes sanctuary cities and free college for illegal immigrants. Aaron Gladd, a Democrat, and the former deputy policy director for Andrew Cuomo, ran against Jordan. Although New York State Senate Democrats enjoyed a wave election in 2018, Jordan defeated Gladd, 67,377 votes to 59,615 votes. Jordan’s election was a positive development for Republicans, especially in the Capital Region, and she was only one of two successful Republican challenger candidates statewide to hold an open New York State seat previously held by a Republican.

In the fall of 2019, Senator Daphne Jordan sponsored the Golden Gathering, a free health and wellness fair for senior citizens across Columbia County. The event was a tremendous success, drawing over 1,000 attendees to Columbia–Greene Community College.

100% Conservative Party Rating

In recognition of her strong, principled, pro-taxpayer voting record, Senator Jordan was recognized with a perfect, 100% rating three times from the Conservative Party of New York State.

Leadership in Opposing Bail Reform

Throughout her time in the New York State Senate, Senator Jordan was a vocal opponent of the “bail reform” law that allowed thousands of criminals to remain free and, in some highly publicized cases, re-offend. Senator Jordan consistently called for a full repeal of cashless bail to strengthen public safety and prevent violent criminals from re-offending.

Opposing Driver’s Licenses for Illegal Immigrants

In the spring of 2019, Senator Jordan led grassroots opposition against a Democratic proposal to give New York State Driver’s Licenses to illegal immigrants, saying the proposal would compromise public safety, opening the door to identity theft and voter fraud. Senator Jordan debated the measure on the Senator Floor and held a press conference in Troy advocating for the measure’s defeat and published an Op-ed in the Troy Record/Saratogian outlining how the measure would jeopardize public safety, and open the door to ID theft, voter fraud, and non-citizens voting.

Success in Getting Golf Courses Reopened

Throughout the pandemic, Senator Jordan was an outspoken voice for the safe, sensible reopening of outdoor golf courses so New Yorkers would have an opportunity to exercise and enjoy the great outdoors to reset and recharge from the stress of the pandemic and negative health outcomes caused by government-mandate lockdowns and shutdowns. On April 18, 2020, Senator Jordan announced her success in getting Governor Cuomo to allow outdoor golf courses to reopen.

After being contacted by numerous small businesses including billiard halls and bowling alleys that were suffering during the pandemic’s shutdown, Senator Jordan led the successful effort to have bowling alleys and billiard halls successfully reopen as both entities proved they could ensure the safety of customers.

Calling for Summer Camps to Reopen

Senator Jordan led a statewide effort to re-open summer camps so students could once again enjoy New York’s great outdoors and build strong friendships with peers, offering an amendment and speaking from the Senate Floor advocating for the policy change that was successful.

Success in Getting Commercial and Residential Construction Restarted

With commercial and residential construction shut down by Governor Cuomo during the pandemic, construction projects were shuttered, and workers lost jobs and untold wages. Senator Jordan was the first state legislator to write Governor Cuomo urging him to direct Empire State Development to restart commercial and residential construction so necessary projects could move forward.  Nine of Jordan’s Senate Republican colleagues cosigned her letter to the Governor requesting that Empire State Development consider residential and commercial construction an essential business. A few weeks after Senator Jordan’s letter was submitted, commercial and residential construction was given a green light to resume as part of a gradual phased-in reopening of economic sectors across the state.

Supporting Local Home Rule

In 2021, Senator Jordan stood with the Town of Copake and local stakeholders including Sensible Solar for Rural New York in opposing plans for a large-scale solar farm advanced under an expedited state siting process. The project was expected to impact 250 acres of farmland and scenic viewsheds in Copake and Senator Jordan urged that the program be rejected.

Advocacy to End to COVID-19 Vaccine Mandates

Senator Jordan was a strong, principled voice for personal choice and parental choice on the matter of mandatory COVID-19 vaccinations, especially for medical care workers, many of whom were fired due to overly restrictive rules put in place by the Cuomo and Hochul Administrations, as well as children in daycare who were forced to wear masks.

Advocating for Answers on Nursing Home Covid Deaths

During the onset of the pandemic, Governor Cuomo’s Health Department issued a deadly mandate that forced nursing homes to accept COVID-19 -positive patients. The NYSDOH memorandum led to the virus spreading like wildfire among the vulnerable nursing home populations causing over 15,000 deaths in nursing homes statewide. Senator Jordan was an early, outspoken advocate for the State Department of Health to end its deadly mandate and provide more Personal Protective Equipment and testing resources to help nursing homes better protect residents from COVID. Senator Jordan demanded accountability and an independent federal and state investigation into the State Department of Health’s mandate to ensure justice for the families that lost a loved one in a nursing home because of Governor Cuomo’s reckless decision.

2020 Re-election

Senator Jordan was re-elected in 2020, winning her race over Democratic challenger Patrick Nelson by a margin of 86,146 to 77,425. Senator Jordan was endorsed for re-election by a broad coalition of business, law enforcement, first responders, taxpayer, and Second Amendment advocacy organizations.

Protecting Small Businesses from Civil Liability and COVID Lawsuits

As small businesses continued suffering from Governor Cuomo’s COVID closures that shut down much of New York’s economy, Senator Jordan introduced legislation, the “Get New York Back to Work Act,” aimed at protecting small businesses that acted in good faith while operating during the pandemic from civil liability and potentially costly lawsuits. Senator Jordan’s legislation, Senate Bill S.2560 received the support of businesses seeking to reopen from the government-mandate closures.

Standing with Mom-and-Pop Landlords

Senator Jordan was the leading voice against Albany’s eviction moratorium and called for the state government to make mom-and-pop landlords whole. Senator Jordan also wrote Governor demanding action and necessary reforms to fix the broken Emergency Rental Assistance Program (ERAP). In 2022, Senator Jordan continued working to assist mom-and-pop landlords that are small businesses and maintained her strong advocacy on this issue.

Leading the Call for Cuomo to Go

Senator Jordan was one of the earliest state elected officials to publicly call for Andrew Cuomo to resign as Governor of New York State due to his disastrous nursing home policy that led to the deaths of over 15,000 senior citizens from COVID, his unethical book deal and $5 million advance, and numerous claims of sexual harassment lodged by female staff members who detailed Cuomo’s unwanted advances.

Honored by the American Red Cross

On March 18, 2022, the American Red Cross named Senator Jordan as a “Legislator of The Year.” The honor was in recognition of Senator Jordan’s unwavering support of the vital mission of the American Red Cross to prevent and alleviate human suffering in the face of emergencies. Senator Jordan was saluted for standing shoulder-to-shoulder with the American Red Cross this year, and throughout her tenure in the New York State Senate, and took part in a virtual recognition ceremony hosted by the American Red Cross. Senator Jordan was the only state legislator recognized with the honor for the entirety of New York State’s Eastern Region.

Delivering for Dwyer

Supporting the Joseph P. Dwyer Peer-to-Peer Veterans Counseling Program was a top priority for Senator Jordan from her first day as State Senator, as she successfully secured a total of $1,720,000 in Dwyer Program funding for Rensselaer, Columbia, and Saratoga counites. Senator Jordan also helped secure the statewide expansion of the Dwyer Program to ensure that more counties across New York State could offer the Dwyer Program’s life-saving counseling services.

Speaking up for Family Farms

In September 2022, Senator Jordan stood with members of the local agriculture community and Senate Republican colleagues calling on the Farm Labor Wage Board in Albany to reject a reduction of the overtime threshold from the current 60 hours to the proposed 40 hours. On January 28, 2022, the Farm Labor Wage Board revisited the overtime threshold set in 2019 through the Farm Laborer Fair Labor Practices Act (FLFLPA) and voted to reduce the threshold from 60 hours to 40 over the next decade, decreasing the threshold by four hours every two years.

Establishing the “Marylou Whitney Way”

Senator Jordan introduced bipartisan legislation to honor the life and legacy of philanthropist Marylou Whitney who passed away July 19, 2019. Senator Jordan’s bill designated a portion of the state highway system in the city of Saratoga Springs as the 'Marylou Whitney Way’ and was signed into law by Governor Kathy Hochul.

Success in Adding DeCrescente Distributing to NYS Historic Preservation Registry

As part of a special statewide effort to celebrate historic businesses, Senator Jordan successfully named DeCrescente Distributing Company to the New York State Historic Business Preservation Registry. The prestigious recognition reflects the DeCrescente Distributing Company’s ongoing commitment and countless contributions to the community and New York State.

Purple Heart Communities Successes

In 2019, Senator Jordan launched a bipartisan grassroots effort to honor the courage of Purple Heart recipients by establishing local Purple Heart Communities across her 43rd Senate District and have New York designated as a “Purple Heart State.” The Purple Heart is the oldest, and among the most venerated, military decorations awarded in the name of the President to those wounded or killed while serving with the U.S. Military. Created by General George Washington to honor and thank the brave soldiers who fought under his command for America’s independence, the Purple Heart has been awarded to almost two million American patriots wounded in battle or killed in action. Within Senator Jordan’s 43rd District, all 60 towns, villages, and cities are now Purple Heart Communities, and all four counties (Saratoga, Rensselaer, Washington, and Columbia) have successfully passed local resolutions to become Purple Heart Counties. In addition, out of the 62 Counties in New York State, more than 40 are now Purple Heart Communities and several more have the designation pending. Senator Jordan also spoke on the Senate Floor in support of her bipartisan legislation.

Putting Principle Ahead of Self-Interest

In May 2022, after a new set of redistricting maps for Congressional and NYS Legislative Districts was released, Senator Jordan’s friend and colleague Senator Jim Tedisco announced his intent to move into the newly constituted 44th Senate District from his new 46th Senate District to challenge her for the seat, causing a firestorm of controversy. Despite Tedisco’s assertions to the contrary, he and Jordan were never put into the same Senate District by redistricting. Instead, Tedisco chose to run in the 44th District against Jordan, his colleague, and friend, as opposed to running against Democratic Senator Neil Breslin for the newly formed 46th Senate District.

Putting party unity first to avoid a highly negative “circus atmosphere” that Tedisco’s move caused and prevent the principles she stood for from being undermined, Senator Jordan announced her decision to not seek re-election to the New York State Senate.

Despite not campaigning, Senator Jordan still received nearly two thousand votes in the Republican Primary and almost one hundred votes in the Conservative Primary for the 44th Senate District.

Personal life 

A resident of Halfmoon, New York, Jordan is married with two children. Jordan is a USA Swimming certified official and loves to play piano at home.

References 

Living people
21st-century American women politicians
21st-century American politicians
Republican Party New York (state) state senators
Women state legislators in New York (state)
People from Halfmoon, New York
New York (state) city council members
Dickinson School of Law alumni
Lehigh University alumni
American people of Greek descent
1959 births
Women city councillors in New York (state)